The 1977 Rutgers Scarlet Knights football team represented Rutgers University in the 1977 NCAA Division I football season. In their fifth season under head coach Frank R. Burns, the Scarlet Knights compiled an 8-3 record while competing as an independent. The team outscored its opponents 291 to 181. The team's statistical leaders included Bret Kosup with 1,445 passing yards, Glen Kehler with 866 rushing yards, and George Carter with 391 receiving yards.

Schedule

References

Rutgers
Rutgers Scarlet Knights football seasons
Rutgers Scarlet Knights football